Radi may refer to:

Raidi (born 1938), Chinese Communist Party politician in Tibet
Radhi (Bhutan), a village in eastern Bhutan's Trashigang district
Rädi, a village in Pärnu County, southwestern Estonia
RADI, a restricted authorised deposit-taking institution